Dale Martin may refer to:
 Dale Martin (scholar), (born 1954), American New Testament scholar
 Dale Martin (politician), American politician
 Dale Martin promotion, English wrestling promotion from 1952 to 1995
 Dale A. Martin, (born 1957), Austrian-Hungarian businessman